The CMLL Universal Championship 2015 (Campeonato Universal in Spanish) is an ongoing professional wrestling tournament, originally announced by the Consejo Mundial de Lucha Libre (CMLL) promotion as starting in August 2015. CMLL started the tournament in October, with no explanation for the change to the schedule. Traditionally the Universal Championship tournament takes place over three Super Viernes. The CMLL Universal Championship is an annual tournament of CMLL champions that was first held in 2009, making the 2015 version the seventh overall tournament. Being a professional wrestling tournament, it is not won legitimately; it is instead won via predetermined outcomes to the matches that is kept secret from the general public.

Background
The tournament will feature 15 professional wrestling matches under single-elimination tournament rules, which means that wrestlers would be eliminated from the tournament when they lose a match. All male "non-regional" CMLL champions at the time of the tournament are eligible to participate in the tournament. The CMLL World Mini-Estrella Championship and Mexican National Lightweight Championship are both exclusively for CMLL's Mini-Estrella division and thus not eligible for the tournament. Regionally promoted championships such as the CMLL Arena Coliseo Tag Team Championship and the Occidente championships promoted in Guadalajara, Jalisco have not been included in the tournament in the past; only titles that have been defended in CMLL's main venue Arena Mexico were included, although exceptions have been made to allow New Japan Pro-Wrestling (NJPW) champions to compete if they were in Mexico at the time. At the time of the tournament being announced CMLL World Welterweight Champion Máscara Dorada was working full-time for NJPW, which meant he would not participate in the tournament.

2015 Universal Championship tournament

Block A (October 2, 2015)

Block B (October 9, 2015)

Tournament brackets
Block A

Block B

Atlantis def. Ultimo Guerrero in the Finals to win the Tournament.

References

2015 in professional wrestling
CMLL Universal Championship